Dowling is an Irish surname. It is an anglicised form representing two unrelated clans:

1 – Ó Dúnlaing, noted as one of the seven septs of County Laois, the ancestral home called Fearann ua n-Dúnlaing (O'Dowling's Country). The Irish form of the name is Ní Dhúnlaing (unmarried female), Ó Dúnlaing (male) or [Bean] Uí Dhúnlaing (married female).

2 – Ó Dubhlainn, a minor family of County Galway, represented by Richard William Dowling (1838–1867), American Confederate officer.

List of people surnamed Dowling
 Alexandra Dowling (born 1990), English actress
 Ann Dowling (born 1952), British mechanical engineer
 Austin Dowling (1868–1930), American prelate of the Roman Catholic Church
 Bairbre Dowling (born 1953), Irish actress
 Bartholomew Dowling (1823–1863) Irish poet
 Brian Dowling (disambiguation), multiple people, including:
Brian Dowling (presenter) (born 1978), Irish television presenter
Brian Dowling (American football) (born 1947), American football player
Brian Dowling (hurler) (born 1983), Irish hurler
 Bridget Dowling (1891–1969), Irish sister-in-law of Adolf Hitler
 Camila Vallejo Dowling, (born 1988), Chilean deputy congresswoman
 Constance Dowling (1920–1969), American model and actress
 Dan Dowling (1906–1993), American cartoonist
 Dereck Dowling (1914–2003), South African cricketer
 Dick Dowling (born 1938), Irish politician
 Eddie Dowling (1889–1976), American actor, director, and producer
 Edward J. Dowling (born 1875), New York politician
 Garry Dowling, Australian rugby league footballer of the 1970s and 1980s
 Gerard Dowling (cricketer) (born 1964), Australian cricketer
 Graham Dowling (born 1937), New Zealand cricketer of the 1960s and 1970s
 Greg Dowling (born 1959), Australian rugby league footballer of the 1980s and 1990s
 Sir James Dowling (1787–1844), English-born Australian jurist
 Jane Dowling (1925–2023), British artist
 Jerry Dowling, American cartoonist
 Jim Dowling, Australian Catholic activist
 Joan Dowling (1928–1954), English character actress
 Joe Dowling (born 1948), American theater director
 John Dowling (disambiguation), multiple people
 Jonathan Dowling, Irish-American quantum physicist
 Joseph Dowling (1922–2014), Irish Fianna Fáil politician
 Kevin Dowling (disambiguation), multiple people, including:
Kevin Dowling (bishop) (born 1944), South African Roman Catholic bishop
Kevin Dowling (darts player) (born 1965), English darts player
Kevin Dowling (director), American film and television director and producer
 Lesley Rae Dowling, South African singer
 Levi H. Dowling (1844–1911), American preacher and author
 Otto Dowling (1881–1946), American Navy captain and Governor of American Samoa
 Owen Dowling (1934-2008), Australian Anglican bishop
 Patrick J. Dowling (born 1939), Irish engineer and educationalist
 Phil Dowling (born 1967), New Zealand curler
 Richard Dowling (disambiguation), multiple people, including:
Richard W. Dowling (1838–1867), Confederate officer in American Civil War
Richard Dowling (writer) (1846–1898), Irish novelist
 Roy Dowling (1901–1969), Australian naval admiral
 Seán Dowling (born 1978), Irish hurler
 Shane Dowling (born 1954), Australian politician
 Terry Dowling (born 1947), Australian writer
 Tom Dowling (disambiguation), multiple people
 Vera Strodl Dowling (1918–2015), Danish pilot
 Victor J. Dowling (1866–1934), American judge and politician
 Vincent Dowling (1929–2013), Irish actor and director
 William Dowling (disambiguation), multiple people

References

 The Surnames of Ireland, Edward McLysaght, Dublin, 1978
 The Dowlings or Doolans of Carricknaughton, Athlone, Eamonn Dowling, Journal of the Irish Family History Society, volume 25, pp. 93–96, 2009
 Gaelic Personal Names, Ó Corráin, D. & Maguire, F., Dublin, 1980. Republished as Irish Names, Dublin. Lilliput, 1990
 An Sloinnteoir Gaeilge & an tAinmneoir, Ó Droighneáin, M. & Ó Murchú, M.A., Dublin, 1991.
 Guild of One-Name Studies:- Dowling One-Name Study https://www.dowling.one-name.net

Surnames
Anglicised Irish-language surnames
Surnames of Irish origin